Dean Victor White (May 25, 1923 – September 14, 2016) was an American billionaire businessman.

Early life
White was born in Norfolk, Nebraska on May 25, 1923, and grew up in Crown Point, Indiana. His father challenged him to "make a million dollars by your 40th birthday". White claimed that he'd "missed, at the most, 12 days of work since 1946."

Career
In 1946, he joined his father's billboard business, Whiteco Advertising Company, and took over in 1952. White sold the company to Chancellor for $960 million in 1998. As of September 2016, he had a net worth of $2.5 billion.

A major Republican donor, White donated $1 million to American Crossroads in the 2012 United States presidential election. He supported numerous Indiana Republicans, including Brian Bosma, and also donated money to the House Republican Campaign Committee of Indiana.

Personal life
He and his wife Barbara had four children, Bruce, Chris, Craig and Cindy. Bruce White headed up White Lodging and sat on the boards of the University of Chicago Hospitals and the Indiana Economic Development Corporation. Dean White died on September 14, 2016 at the age of 93. The Dean and Barbara White Family Foundation has supported the Indiana State Museum.

See also
List of billionaires

References

External links
Forbes.com: Forbes World's Richest People

1923 births
2016 deaths
20th-century American businesspeople
American advertising executives
American billionaires
Indiana Republicans
People from Crown Point, Indiana
People from Norfolk, Nebraska